Nina Toussaint-White is an English actress who has acted in Casualty, The Bill, and EastEnders.

Early life
Toussaint-White was raised in Plumstead, south east London, Toussaint-White was educated at Plumstead Manor School and Negus Sixth Form Centre, and subsequently trained at the Italia Conti Academy of Theatre Arts, Clapham, on their three-year B.A. acting course.

Career
She made her professional debut in a 2007 episode of Casualty, followed by an appearance in The Bill, a year later.

In 2009, Toussaint-White was offered the part of nurse Syd, a new love interest for Bradley Branning in EastEnders, making her first screen appearance in February 2009.  She played this character until her departure in October 2009. She has also appeared in Primeval, and acted in several stage productions, including Race, which was produced in the UK at London's Hampstead Theatre from 23 May to 29 June 2013. Directed by Terry Johnson, Toussaint-White performed alongside Jasper Britton, Charles Daish and Clarke Peters. 

Following her departure from EastEnders in 2009, Toussaint-White appeared in the Doctor Who episode "Let's Kill Hitler" which aired on 27 August 2011. In February 2012 she appeared as Mattie Grace in Holby City. In March 2012, it was announced that Toussaint-White would appear opposite her ex-EastEnders co-star Lacey Turner in the ITV2 supernatural drama Switch.

In 2015, Toussaint-White appeared as Tree in The Etienne Sisters at the Theatre Royal Stratford East. For this performance she was nominated for Best Performance in a Musical in the 2016 UK Theatre Awards alongside her co-cast members Allyson Ava-Brown and Jennifer Saayeng. In September 2016, Toussaint-White appeared as Jane alongside Dominic Cooper and Ophelia Lovibond in the revival of The Libertine by Stephen Jeffreys at the Theatre Royal Bath. In 2018, Toussaint-White appeared in the BBC One show Bodyguard, a six part drama created and written by Jed Mercurio. Starring opposite Richard Madden and Keeley Hawes, Toussaint-White portrayed DS Louise Rayburn. In December 2021, Toussaint-White was cast in the action film Kandahar directed by Ric Roman Waugh.

Personal life
Toussaint-White lives in London and is married to the actor Joey Ellis.

Filmography

References

External links

 

Living people
1985 births
Alumni of the Italia Conti Academy of Theatre Arts
Black British actresses
English people of Grenadian descent
English soap opera actresses
People from Plumstead